Orlando Ramírez Leal (born December 18, 1951 in Cartagena, Colombia), also known as El Ñato (Snub Nose), is a former Major League Baseball shortstop and right-handed batter who played for the California Angels between 1974 and 1979. He was the first recognized Colombian-born player in major league history, following Luis Castro, who played 42 games for the Philadelphia Athletics in the 1902 season.

In his 143-game major league career, Ramírez batted .189 with 16 RBI, 24 runs, five doubles, one triple and 16 stolen bases.

Early Colombian career 
Ramírez began his career with the Willard club from Barranquilla, Colombia in 1966 which was recognized as the top level of Colombian baseball. At the age of 17, Ramírez made the Colombian national team and debuted in his first game in the Amateur World Series held in Santo Domingo. He batted third and played third base on the Colombian national team. In the 1970 and 1971 Amateur World Series, Ramírez played shortstop and led all players in stolen bases. He led the Colombian national team to a silver medal in the 1971 Amateur World Series. He also won a bronze medal at the 1971 Pan American Games.

Career in the United States 
Ramírez first played Double-A baseball for Shreveport in the Texas League. He excelled and was transferred to Idaho Falls in the Pioneer Rookie League. From Idaho Falls, he was sent to the minors in 1973, playing for the Quad Cities where he soon played Double-A again in 1974. A short time after playing Double-A, Ramírez was sent to the majors to play for the California Angels.

Colombian significance
Ramírez was inducted in the Colombian Baseball Hall of Fame in September 2009. He was the first Colombian to play in the Major Leagues. The Colombian Professional Baseball League Most Valuable Player award has been in his name since the winter of 2005-06.

See also
 Players from Colombia in MLB

References

External links

1951 births
Living people
Sportspeople from Cartagena, Colombia
Colombian expatriate baseball players in the United States
Major League Baseball players from Colombia
Major League Baseball shortstops
California Angels players
Charleston Charlies players
Quad Cities Angels players
Shreveport Captains players
El Paso Diablos players
Salt Lake City Gulls players
Bakersfield Outlaws players
Baseball players at the 1971 Pan American Games
Pan American Games medalists in baseball
Pan American Games bronze medalists for Colombia
Medalists at the 1971 Pan American Games
Idaho Falls Angels players
Dorados de Chihuahua players
Colombian expatriate baseball players in Mexico